Pilosocereus leucocephalus, called old man cactus (along with a number of similar species), old man of Mexico, tuno, and woolly torch, is a species of cactus in the genus Pilosocereus, native to Mexico and Central America. It has gained the Royal Horticultural Society's Award of Garden Merit. Pilosocereus leucocephalus functions as a keystone species in dry landscapes found in Mesoamerica. The fruit this cactus produces is relied upon as a source of hydration and sugar in arid areas by frugivores such as birds, bats, and even some reptiles.

References

leucocephalus
Flora of Mexico
Flora of Guatemala
Flora of Honduras
Flora of Nicaragua
Plants described in 1994